The 1970 Pittsburgh Pirates season resulted in the team winning their first National League East title with a record of 89–73, five games ahead of the Chicago Cubs. However, they lost the NLCS to the NL West Champion Cincinnati Reds, three games to none.

The Pirates were managed by Danny Murtaugh and played their home games at Forbes Field during the first part of the year, before moving into the brand new Three Rivers Stadium on July 16. Coinciding with their move, the Pirates became the first major league team to adopt pullover jerseys and sans-a-belt pants for their uniforms, a style copied by a majority of MLB for the next two decades and which the Pirates themselves would wear through the 1990 season.

Offseason

Three Rivers Stadium 
In 1958, the Pirates had sold Forbes Field to the University of Pittsburgh, who wanted the land for expanded graduate facilities. Pitt then leased Forbes back to the Pirates until a new multipurpose stadium could be built. The Steelers opted to play at Pitt Stadium in the meantime. In June 1970, the Pirates played their final game at Forbes Field. It was a doubleheader sweep of the Chicago Cubs and Bill Mazeroski got the final hit at Forbes Field.

A site on the North Side had been chosen earlier in the year, but it took until April 25, 1968, to finally break ground. Three Rivers Stadium opened on July 16, 1970, and became the home of the Pirates and the Pittsburgh Steelers.

Notable transactions 
 October 9, 1969: Danny Murtaugh named Manager of the Pirates.
 October 21, 1969: Dave Giusti and Dave Ricketts were traded to the Pirates by the St. Louis Cardinals for Carl Taylor.
 February 4, 1970: Bo Belinsky was traded by the Pirates to the Cincinnati Reds for Dennis Ribant.

Regular season 
 June 12, 1970: Dock Ellis threw a no-hitter against the San Diego Padres. Allegedly, Ellis pitched the no-hitter on acid. According to Ellis, in Donald Hall's book, In the Country of Baseball, the Pirates were starting a west-coast road trip. After the Pirates landed in San Diego, Ellis visited his hometown of Los Angeles for a party. Ellis had forgotten he was slated to pitch the next day, so he took some acid the night before the game. At around 10 a.m., after catching maybe an hour of sleep, he realized he was in the wrong place.

Season standings

Record vs. opponents

Detailed records

Game log 

|- bgcolor="ffbbbb"
| 1 || April 7 || Mets || 3–5 (11) || Taylor || Hartenstein (0–1) || McGraw || 34,249 || 0–1
|- bgcolor="ccffcc"
| 2 || April 9 || Mets || 2–1 || Ellis (1–0) || Koosman || — || 9,884 || 1–1
|- bgcolor="ffbbbb"
| 3 || April 10 || @ Phillies || 0–2 || Fryman || Veale (0–1) || — || 3,663 || 1–2
|- bgcolor="ccffcc"
| 4 || April 11 || @ Phillies || 4–0 || Walker (1–0) || Jackson || Hartenstein (1) || 7,673 || 2–2
|- bgcolor="ccffcc"
| 5 || April 12 || @ Phillies || 3–1 (10) || Blass (1–0) || Bunning || — || 22,395 || 3–2
|- bgcolor="ccffcc"
| 6 || April 14 || @ Mets || 6–4 (10) || Hartenstein (1–1) || McGraw || — || 41,679 || 4–2
|- bgcolor="ccffcc"
| 7 || April 16 || @ Mets || 7–4 || Dal Canton (1–0) || Cardwell || — || 8,623 || 5–2
|- bgcolor="ffbbbb"
| 8 || April 17 || Cardinals || 2–5 || Culver || Blass (1–1) || — || 14,369 || 5–3
|- bgcolor="ffbbbb"
| 9 || April 18 || Cardinals || 1–6 || Carlton || Walker (1–1) || — || 8,465 || 5–4
|- bgcolor="ccffcc"
| 10 || April 20 || Astros || 3–1 || Ellis (2–0) || Bouton || Giusti (1) || 4,051 || 6–4
|- bgcolor="ccffcc"
| 11 || April 21 || Astros || 9–8 || Veale (1–1) || Dierker || Gibbon (1) || 3,589 || 7–4
|- bgcolor="ccffcc"
| 12 || April 22 || Astros || 6–1 || Blass (2–1) || Lemaster || — || 6,178 || 8–4
|- bgcolor="ccffcc"
| 13 || April 23 || Braves || 8–6 || Walker (2–1) || Jarvis || Giusti (2) || 4,987 || 9–4
|- bgcolor="ffbbbb"
| 14 || April 24 || Braves || 0–9 || Nash || Moose (0–1) || — || 5,413 || 9–5
|- bgcolor="ccffcc"
| 15 || April 25 || Braves || 8–7 || Giusti (1–0) || Wilhelm || McBean (1) || 7,125 || 10–5
|- bgcolor="ffbbbb"
| 16 || April 26 || Braves || 0–2 || Niekro || Veale (1–2) || — || 15,307 || 10–6
|- bgcolor="ffbbbb"
| 17 || April 27 || Cubs || 0–1 || Decker || Blass (2–2) || Regan || 6,635 || 10–7
|- bgcolor="ccffcc"
| 18 || April 28 || Cubs || 6–1 || Walker (3–1) || Holtzman || Giusti (3) || 6,717 || 11–7
|- bgcolor="ffbbbb"
| 19 || April 29 || Cubs || 5–10 || Hands || Moose (0–2) || Regan || 7,900 || 11–8
|-

|- bgcolor="ffbbbb"
| 20 || May 1 || @ Reds || 4–6 || Simpson || Ellis (2–1) || Gullett || 19,470 || 11–9
|- bgcolor="ffbbbb"
| 21 || May 2 || @ Reds || 2–7 || McGlothlin || Veale (1–3) || — || 7,721 || 11–10
|- bgcolor="ffbbbb"
| 22 || May 3 || @ Reds || 7–11 || Merritt || Blass (2–3) || Carroll || 15,219 || 11–11
|- bgcolor="ffbbbb"
| 23 || May 4 || @ Braves || 3–5 || Nash || Walker (3–2) || Priddy || 7,457 || 11–12
|- bgcolor="ffbbbb"
| 24 || May 5 || @ Braves || 6–12 || Stone || Moose (0–3) || Wilhelm || 9,199 || 11–13
|- bgcolor="ffbbbb"
| 25 || May 6 || @ Braves || 0–3 || Niekro || Ellis (2–2) || — || 9,782 || 11–14
|- bgcolor="ccffcc"
| 26 || May 7 || @ Astros || 9–5 || Walker (4–2) || Bouton || Giusti (4) || 11,678 || 12–14
|- bgcolor="ffbbbb"
| 27 || May 8 || @ Astros || 5–7 || Ray || Blass (2–4) || — || 13,383 || 12–15
|- bgcolor="ccffcc"
| 28 || May 9 || @ Astros || 6–3 || Moose (1–3) || Griffin || — || 15,137 || 13–15
|- bgcolor="ffbbbb"
| 29 || May 10 || @ Astros || 2–9 || Dierker || Ellis (2–3) || — || 16,768 || 13–16
|- bgcolor="ccffcc"
| 30 || May 11 || Reds || 4–1 || Veale (2–3) || McGlothlin || — || 7,722 || 14–16
|- bgcolor="ffbbbb"
| 31 || May 12 || Reds || 3–5 || Merritt || Blass (2–5) || — || 7,502 || 14–17
|- bgcolor="ccffcc"
| 32 || May 13 || @ Cardinals || 5–1 || Moose (2–3) || Gibson || Giusti (5) || 12,677 || 15–17
|- bgcolor="ffbbbb"
| 33 || May 14 || @ Cardinals || 7–11 || Johnson || Garber (0–1) || — || 10,840 || 15–18
|- bgcolor="ffbbbb"
| 34 || May 15 || Expos || 1–2 || McGinn || Veale (2–4) || — || 7,883 || 15–19
|- bgcolor="ccffcc"
| 35 || May 16 || Expos || 4–3 || Walker (5–2) || Raymond || — || 4,237 || 16–19
|- bgcolor="ffbbbb"
| 36 || May 17 || Expos || 7–8 || Strohmayer || Garber (0–2) || Raymond || 8,604 || 16–20
|- bgcolor="ccffcc"
| 37 || May 18 || Phillies || 2–1 || Moose (3–3) || Bunning || — || 5,796 || 17–20
|- bgcolor="ffbbbb"
| 38 || May 19 || Phillies || 0–2 || Short || Ellis (2–4) || — || 6,251 || 17–21
|- bgcolor="ccffcc"
| 39 || May 20 || Phillies || 3–2 (14) || Dal Canton (2–0) || Selma || — || 5,977 || 18–21
|- bgcolor="ffbbbb"
| 40 || May 21 || @ Expos || 6–7 || Dillman || Walker (5–3) || — || 13,346 || 18–22
|- bgcolor="ffbbbb"
| 41 || May 22 || @ Expos || 3–6 || Stoneman || Moose (3–4) || — || 10,576 || 18–23
|- bgcolor="ccffcc"
| 42 || May 23 || @ Expos || 8–4 || Ellis (3–4) || McGinn || Giusti (6) || 28,702 || 19–23
|- bgcolor="ccffcc"
| 43 || May 24 || @ Expos || 3–0 || Veale (3–4) || Morton || — || 29,306 || 20–23
|- bgcolor="ffbbbb"
| 44 || May 26 || @ Cubs || 3–6 || Holtzman || Blass (2–6) || — || 12,440 || 20–24
|- bgcolor="ccffcc"
| 45 || May 27 || @ Cubs || 4–0 || Moose (4–4) || Jenkins || — || 11,002 || 21–24
|- bgcolor="ffbbbb"
| 46 || May 28 || @ Cubs || 7–8 || Colborn || Garber (0–3) || — || 10,805 || 21–25
|- bgcolor="ccffcc"
| 47 || May 29 || Giants || 6–3 || Veale (4–4) || Robertson || Giusti (7) || 11,497 || 22–25
|- bgcolor="ffbbbb"
| 48 || May 30 || Giants || 11–13 || Bryant || Blass (2–7) || Faul || 10,658 || 22–26
|- bgcolor="ccffcc"
| 49 || May 31 || Giants || 7–3 || Moose (5–4) || Marichal || Giusti (8) || 9,515 || 23–26
|-

|- bgcolor="ccffcc"
| 50 || June 1 || Padres || 5–1 || Ellis (4–4) || Coombs || — || 5,036 || 24–26
|- bgcolor="ffbbbb"
| 51 || June 2 || Padres || 8–14 || Herbel || Veale (4–5) || Dukes || 4,747 || 24–27
|- bgcolor="ffbbbb"
| 52 || June 4 || Dodgers || 0–5 || Osteen || Blass (2–8) || — || 5,423 || 24–28
|- bgcolor="ccffcc"
| 53 || June 5 || Dodgers || 3–0 || Moose (6–4) || Moeller || — || 7,691 || 25–28
|- bgcolor="ccffcc"
| 54 || June 6 || Dodgers || 7–6 (12) || Giusti (2–0) || Pena || — || 13,153 || 26–28
|- bgcolor="ccffcc"
| 55 || June 7 || Dodgers || 3–1 || Veale (5–5) || Foster || — || 11,243 || 27–28
|- bgcolor="ccffcc"
| 56 || June 9 || @ Giants || 5–1 || Blass (3–8) || Marichal || — || 4,250 || 28–28
|- bgcolor="ffbbbb"
| 57 || June 10 || @ Giants || 2–4 || Perry || Moose (6–5) || — || 3,732 || 28–29
|- bgcolor="ccffcc"
| 58 || June 12 || @ Padres || 2–0 || Ellis (5–4) || Roberts || — ||  || 29–29
|- bgcolor="ffbbbb"
| 59 || June 12 || @ Padres || 2–5 || Coombs || Veale (5–6) || — || 9,903 || 29–30
|- bgcolor="ccffcc"
| 60 || June 13 || @ Padres || 7–2 || Blass (4–8) || Santorini || — || 7,105 || 30–30
|- bgcolor="ffbbbb"
| 61 || June 14 || @ Padres || 1–2 || Kirby || Moose (6–6) || — || 15,781 || 30–31
|- bgcolor="ccffcc"
| 62 || June 15 || @ Dodgers || 5–2 || Nelson (1–0) || Moeller || Giusti (9) || 14,490 || 31–31
|- bgcolor="ffbbbb"
| 63 || June 16 || @ Dodgers || 0–1 || Sutton || Veale (5–7) || — || 20,069 || 31–32
|- bgcolor="ffbbbb"
| 64 || June 17 || @ Dodgers || 0–4 || Osteen || Ellis (5–5) || — || 17,327 || 31–33
|- bgcolor="ccffcc"
| 65 || June 19 || Expos || 8–4 || Dal Canton (3–0) || Dillman || Walker (1) || 9,707 || 32–33
|- bgcolor="ccffcc"
| 66 || June 20 || Expos || 4–2 || Blass (5–8) || Morton || Giusti (10) || 5,148 || 33–33
|- bgcolor="ffbbbb"
| 67 || June 21 || Expos || 2–3 || Nye || Veale (5–8) || — || 12,325 || 33–34
|- bgcolor="ffbbbb"
| 68 || June 22 || Cardinals || 1–6 || Reuss || Ellis (5–6) || — ||  || 33–35
|- bgcolor="ccffcc"
| 69 || June 22 || Cardinals || 1–0 (10) || Nelson (2–0) || Linzy || — || 15,158 || 34–35
|- bgcolor="ccffcc"
| 70 || June 23 || Cardinals || 7–2 || Moose (7–6) || Taylor || — || 7,654 || 35–35
|- bgcolor="ccffcc"
| 71 || June 24 || Cardinals || 4–3 (11) || Walker (6–3) || McCool || — || 8,095 || 36–35
|- bgcolor="ccffcc"
| 72 || June 25 || Cardinals || 3–2 || Giusti (3–0) || Carlton || — || 9,910 || 37–35
|- bgcolor="ccffcc"
| 73 || June 27 || Cubs || 2–1 || Ellis (6–6) || Jenkins || — || 10,188 || 38–35
|- bgcolor="ccffcc"
| 74 || June 28 || Cubs || 3–2 || Giusti (4–0) || Hands || Walker (2) ||  || 39–35
|- bgcolor="ccffcc"
| 75 || June 28 || Cubs || 4–1 || Nelson (3–0) || Pappas || Giusti (11) || 40,918 || 40–35
|- bgcolor="ffbbbb"
| 76 || June 29 || @ Mets || 2–3 || Seaver || Blass (5–9) || — || 42,416 || 40–36
|- bgcolor="ffbbbb"
| 77 || June 30 || @ Mets || 6–7 || Koosman || Veale (5–9) || Taylor || 38,681 || 40–37
|-

|- bgcolor="ccffcc"
| 78 || July 1 || @ Mets || 4–3 || Ellis (7–6) || McAndrew || Giusti (12) || 34,316 || 41–37
|- bgcolor="ccffcc"
| 79 || July 3 || @ Cubs || 16–14 || Giusti (5–0) || Regan || — || 26,602 || 42–37
|- bgcolor="ccffcc"
| 80 || July 4 || @ Cubs || 10–6 || Blass (6–9) || Holtzman || Walker (3) ||  || 43–37
|- bgcolor="ffbbbb"
| 81 || July 4 || @ Cubs || 2–7 || Pappas || Veale (5–10) || Gura || 26,634 || 43–38
|- bgcolor="ccffcc"
| 82 || July 5 || @ Cubs || 5–2 || Ellis (8–6) || Jenkins || — || 25,569 || 44–38
|- bgcolor="ccffcc"
| 83 || July 6 || @ Phillies || 7–5 || Nelson (4–0) || Bunning || Giusti (13) || 6,145 || 45–38
|- bgcolor="ccffcc"
| 84 || July 7 || @ Phillies || 4–2 || Veale (6–10) || Short || Giusti (14) || 6,938 || 46–38
|- bgcolor="ffbbbb"
| 85 || July 8 || @ Phillies || 0–2 || Wise || Blass (6–10) || — || 7,038 || 46–39
|- bgcolor="ccffcc"
| 86 || July 9 || @ Cardinals || 6–0 || Ellis (9–6) || Carlton || — || 22,345 || 47–39
|- bgcolor="ccffcc"
| 87 || July 10 || @ Cardinals || 6–2 || Giusti (6–0) || Gibson || — || 23,920 || 48–39
|- bgcolor="ccffcc"
| 88 || July 11 || @ Cardinals || 8–7 || Dal Canton (4–0) || Taylor || Pena (1) || 25,686 || 49–39
|- bgcolor="ccffcc"
| 89 || July 12 || @ Cardinals || 7–6 (10) || Giusti (7–0) || Hrabosky || Dal Canton (1) || 45,776 || 50–39
|- bgcolor="ffbbbb"
| 90 || July 16 || Reds || 2–3 || Carroll || Ellis (9–7) || — || 48,846 || 50–40
|- bgcolor="ccffcc"
| 91 || July 17 || Reds || 4–3 || Giusti (8–0) || Simpson || — || 23,298 || 51–40
|- bgcolor="ffbbbb"
| 92 || July 18 || Reds || 1–3 (10) || Merritt || Giusti (8–1) || Granger || 27,906 || 51–41
|- bgcolor="ccffcc"
| 93 || July 19 || Reds || 7–3 || Walker (7–3) || Gullett || Gibbon (2) || 32,294 || 52–41
|- bgcolor="ffbbbb"
| 94 || July 20 || @ Astros || 4–5 (12) || Cook || Dal Canton (4–1) || — || 17,934 || 52–42
|- bgcolor="ffbbbb"
| 95 || July 21 || @ Astros || 1–3 || Wilson || Nelson (4–1) || Cook || 17,741 || 52–43
|- bgcolor="ccffcc"
| 96 || July 22 || Braves || 5–3 || Dal Canton (5–1) || Stone || Giusti (15) || 19,145 || 53–43
|- bgcolor="ccffcc"
| 97 || July 23 || Braves || 6–5 || Colpaert (1–0) || McQueen || Giusti (16) || 14,377 || 54–43
|- bgcolor="ccffcc"
| 98 || July 24 || Astros || 11–0 || Ellis (10–7) || Griffin || — || 43,290 || 55–43
|- bgcolor="ffbbbb"
| 99 || July 25 || Astros || 4–8 || Cook || Veale (6–11) || Dierker || 14,069 || 55–44
|- bgcolor="ffbbbb"
| 100 || July 26 || Astros || 4–6 (10) || Lemaster || Giusti (8–2) || Gladding || 40,131 || 55–45
|- bgcolor="ccffcc"
| 101 || July 28 || @ Reds || 4–3 || Dal Canton (6–1) || McGlothlin || Giusti (17) || 25,807 || 56–45
|- bgcolor="ffbbbb"
| 102 || July 29 || @ Reds || 3–4 || Nolan || Ellis (10–8) || Granger || 25,788 || 56–46
|- bgcolor="ffbbbb"
| 103 || July 30 || @ Reds || 4–8 || Cloninger || Veale (6–12) || Gullett || 26,298 || 56–47
|- bgcolor="ffbbbb"
| 104 || July 31 || @ Braves || 3–4 || Jarvis || Nelson (4–2) || Wilhelm || 12,196 || 56–48
|-

|- bgcolor="ccffcc"
| 105 || August 1 || @ Braves || 20–10 || Pena (1–0) || Stone || Giusti (18) || 28,333 || 57–48
|- bgcolor="ccffcc"
| 106 || August 2 || @ Braves || 10–7 || Ellis (11–8) || Nash || Giusti (19) || 15,227 || 58–48
|- bgcolor="ffbbbb"
| 107 || August 3 || @ Expos || 0–8 || McGinn || Moose (7–7) || — || 18,110 || 58–49
|- bgcolor="ccffcc"
| 108 || August 4 || @ Expos || 4–2 || Veale (7–12) || Marshall || — || 27,112 || 59–49
|- bgcolor="ccffcc"
| 109 || August 5 || Phillies || 4–0 || Walker (8–3) || Wise || — || 12,915 || 60–49
|- bgcolor="ccffcc"
| 110 || August 6 || Phillies || 4–0 || Ellis (12–8) || Bunning || — ||  || 61–49
|- bgcolor="ccffcc"
| 111 || August 6 || Phillies || 8–3 || Dal Canton (7–1) || Champion || — || 26,664 || 62–49
|- bgcolor="ccffcc"
| 112 || August 7 || Mets || 6–1 || Moose (8–7) || McAndrew || — || 37,556 || 63–49
|- bgcolor="ffbbbb"
| 113 || August 8 || Mets || 9–12 || Koosman || Veale (7–13) || Gentry || 27,843 || 63–50
|- bgcolor="ccffcc"
| 114 || August 9 || Mets || 8–3 || Walker (9–3) || Ryan || Pena (2) || 41,772 || 64–50
|- bgcolor="ffbbbb"
| 115 || August 10 || Mets || 2–10 || Seaver || Ellis (12–9) || — || 47,148 || 64–51
|- bgcolor="ffbbbb"
| 116 || August 11 || Dodgers || 4–5 || Osteen || Dal Canton (7–2) || Brewer || 16,708 || 64–52
|- bgcolor="ffbbbb"
| 117 || August 12 || Dodgers || 4–11 || Mikkelsen || Moose (8–8) || Hough || 34,551 || 64–53
|- bgcolor="ccffcc"
| 118 || August 14 || Padres || 2–1 || Pena (2–0) || Roberts || — ||  || 65–53
|- bgcolor="ccffcc"
| 119 || August 14 || Padres || 10–1 || Walker (10–3) || Dobson || — || 26,979 || 66–53
|- bgcolor="ccffcc"
| 120 || August 15 || Padres || 9–3 || Veale (8–13) || Wilson || — || 14,110 || 67–53
|- bgcolor="ffbbbb"
| 121 || August 16 || Padres || 6–8 || Herbel || Pena (2–1) || Dukes || 18,969 || 67–54
|- bgcolor="ffbbbb"
| 122 || August 17 || Giants || 4–5 || Perry || Dal Canton (7–3) || — || 21,148 || 67–55
|- bgcolor="ccffcc"
| 123 || August 18 || Giants || 6–2 || Blass (7–10) || Pitlock || Giusti (20) || 25,325 || 68–55
|- bgcolor="ffbbbb"
| 124 || August 19 || Giants || 4–7 || Marichal || Walker (10–4) || — || 24,655 || 68–56
|- bgcolor="ffbbbb"
| 125 || August 21 || @ Dodgers || 1–2 || Osteen || Veale (8–14) || — || 24,372 || 68–57
|- bgcolor="ccffcc"
| 126 || August 22 || @ Dodgers || 2–1 (16) || Dal Canton (8–3) || Mikkelsen || — || 39,829 || 69–57
|- bgcolor="ccffcc"
| 127 || August 23 || @ Dodgers || 11–0 || Blass (8–10) || Foster || — || 20,678 || 70–57
|- bgcolor="ffbbbb"
| 128 || August 25 || @ Padres || 3–4 || Dukes || Walker (10–5) || — || 4,876 || 70–58
|- bgcolor="ffbbbb"
| 129 || August 26 || @ Padres || 1–2 || Dobson || Cambria (0–1) || Dukes || 6,067 || 70–59
|- bgcolor="ffbbbb"
| 130 || August 28 || @ Giants || 1–5 || Marichal || Moose (8–9) || — || 6,174 || 70–60
|- bgcolor="ffbbbb"
| 131 || August 29 || @ Giants || 9–10 (10) || McMahon || Dal Canton (8–4) || — || 8,188 || 70–61
|- bgcolor="ffbbbb"
| 132 || August 30 || @ Giants || 3–7 || Johnson || Walker (10–6) || Robertson ||  || 70–62
|- bgcolor="ffbbbb"
| 133 || August 30 || @ Giants || 1–2 || Bryant || Giusti (8–3) || — || 15,963 || 70–63
|-

|- bgcolor="ccffcc"
| 134 || September 1 || @ Expos || 8–4 || Veale (9–14) || Stoneman || Giusti (21) || 20,123 || 71–63
|- bgcolor="ffbbbb"
| 135 || September 2 || @ Expos || 7–10 || Marshall || Gibbon (0–1) || — || 15,461 || 71–64
|- bgcolor="ccffcc"
| 136 || September 4 || Phillies || 4–3 || Blass (9–10) || Wise || Lamb (1) || 22,547 || 72–64
|- bgcolor="ccffcc"
| 137 || September 5 || Phillies || 6–4 || Cambria (1–1) || Lersch || Giusti (22) || 22,925 || 73–64
|- bgcolor="ccffcc"
| 138 || September 6 || Phillies || 4–3 (10) || Walker (11–6) || Selma || — || 19,049 || 74–64
|- bgcolor="ccffcc"
| 139 || September 7 || Cubs || 8–3 || Moose (9–9) || Pappas || — ||  || 75–64
|- bgcolor="ffbbbb"
| 140 || September 7 || Cubs || 2–9 || Jenkins || Veale (9–15) || — || 42,556 || 75–65
|- bgcolor="ffbbbb"
| 141 || September 8 || Cubs || 3–10 || Hands || Blass (9–11) || — || 6,777 || 75–66
|- bgcolor="ffbbbb"
| 142 || September 9 || Cardinals || 4–6 || Bertaina || Cambria (1–2) || Hilgendorf || 14,927 || 75–67
|- bgcolor="ccffcc"
| 143 || September 10 || Cardinals || 2–0 || Walker (12–6) || Briles || — || 14,386 || 76–67
|- bgcolor="ccffcc"
| 144 || September 12 || @ Cubs || 5–4 || Moose (10–9) || Jenkins || Giusti (23) || 33,199 || 77–67
|- bgcolor="ffbbbb"
| 145 || September 13 || @ Cubs || 2–3 || Hands || Blass (9–12) || — || 22,567 || 77–68
|- bgcolor="ccffcc"
| 146 || September 15 || @ Phillies || 8–3 || Walker (13–6) || Lersch || Giusti (24) || 4,802 || 78–68
|- bgcolor="ccffcc"
| 147 || September 16 || @ Phillies || 5–3 || Moose (11–9) || Bunning || Lamb (2) || 4,418 || 79–68
|- bgcolor="ffbbbb"
| 148 || September 17 || @ Phillies || 2–3 || Short || Lamb (0–1) || Selma || 4,199 || 79–69
|- bgcolor="ccffcc"
| 149 || September 18 || @ Mets || 3–2 || Blass (10–12) || McAndrew || Giusti (25) || 42,225 || 80–69
|- bgcolor="ccffcc"
| 150 || September 19 || @ Mets || 2–1 || Walker (14–6) || Gentry || Gibbon (3) || 41,323 || 81–69
|- bgcolor="ffbbbb"
| 151 || September 20 || @ Mets || 1–4 || Koosman || Moose (11–10) || — ||  || 81–70
|- bgcolor="ccffcc"
| 152 || September 20 || @ Mets || 9–5 (10) || Giusti (9–3) || McGraw || — || 54,806 || 82–70
|- bgcolor="ffbbbb"
| 153 || September 22 || Expos || 0–1 || Stoneman || Ellis (12–10) || — ||  || 82–71
|- bgcolor="ccffcc"
| 154 || September 22 || Expos || 3–1 || Veale (10–15) || Wegener || Gibbon (4) || 19,524 || 83–71
|- bgcolor="ffbbbb"
| 155 || September 23 || Expos || 2–3 || Morton || Brunet (0–1) || Marshall || 12,420 || 83–72
|- bgcolor="ccffcc"
| 156 || September 24 || Expos || 8–0 || Walker (15–6) || Renko || — || 14,026 || 84–72
|- bgcolor="ccffcc"
| 157 || September 25 || Mets || 4–3 || Grant (1–0) || Chance || Gibbon (5) || 41,484 || 85–72
|- bgcolor="ccffcc"
| 158 || September 26 || Mets || 4–3 || Grant (2–0) || Herbel || — || 34,311 || 86–72
|- bgcolor="ccffcc"
| 159 || September 27 || Mets || 2–1 || Ellis (13–10) || McAndrew || Giusti (26) || 50,469 || 87–72
|- bgcolor="ccffcc"
| 160 || September 29 || @ Cardinals || 7–2 || Dal Canton (9–4) || Gibson || Lamb (3) || 13,232 || 88–72
|- bgcolor="ffbbbb"
| 161 || September 30 || @ Cardinals || 3–4 || Briles || Grant (2–1) || — || 8,084 || 88–73
|-

|- bgcolor="ccffcc"
| 162 || October 1 || @ Cardinals || 9–5 || Brunet (1–1) || Cleveland || Acosta (1) || 8,457 || 89–73
|-

|-
| Legend:       = Win       = LossBold = Pirates team member

Opening Day lineup

Notable transactions 
 April 24, 1970: Al McBean was signed by the Pirates.
 May 18, 1970: Al McBean was released by the Pirates.
 June 4, 1970: 1970 Major League Baseball draft
Dave Parker was drafted by the Pirates in the 14th round of the 1970 Major League Baseball draft.
Ed Ott was drafted by the Pirates in the 23rd round of the 1970 Major League Baseball draft.
 June 9, 1970: Orlando Peña was signed by the Pirates.
 June 22, 1970: Chuck Hartenstein was selected off waivers from the Pirates by the St. Louis Cardinals.
 August 26, 1970: Orlando Pena was released by the Pirates.
 August 31, 1970: George Brunet was traded to the Pirates by the Washington Senators for Denny Riddleberger.
 September 14, 1970: Dave Ricketts was released by the Pirates.
 September 14, 1970: Mudcat Grant was traded to the Pirates by the Oakland Athletics for Angel Mangual.

Roster

Postseason

National League Championship Series 

The Cincinnati Reds won the series, three games to none, over the Pirates.

Statistics 
Batting
Note: G = Games played; AB = At bats; H = Hits; Avg. = Batting average; HR = Home runs; RBI = Runs batted in

Pitching
Note: G = Games pitched; IP = Innings pitched; W = Wins; L = Losses; ERA = Earned run average; SO = Strikeouts

Awards and honors 
 Danny Murtaugh, Associated Press NL Manager of the Year
1970 Major League Baseball All-Star Game

Farm system 

LEAGUE CHAMPIONS: Waterbury

Notes

References 
 1970 Pittsburgh Pirates at Baseball Reference
 1970 Pittsburgh Pirates at Baseball Almanac

Pittsburgh Pirates seasons
Pittsburgh Pirates season
National League East champion seasons
Pittsburg